Ortega Deniran (born 28 May 1986) is a Nigerian retired footballer who works as a manager for Warri Wolves.

Career
Between 2004 and 2005, he was in Guatemala and played in the local team CD Suchitepéquez. In Apertura 2004–05 season he played in 11 matches and scored 4 goals. In Clausura 2004–05 season he played in 17 matches and scored 5 goals.

In June 2006, Deniran signed for Chongqing Lifan. He joined Spartak in February 2007 on a free transfer. After six months in Spartak, he signed with Slavia Sofia in July 2007. On 23 July 2009 he joined Levski Sofia on loan. Deniran scored his first two goals for Levski on 8 August 2009 against Botev Plovdiv. The result of the match was 5:0 with a home win for Levski. In 2010, he moved to Armenian side FC Banants. In 2011, he returned to Slavia, but shortly he was removed from the training camp by Emil Velev for lack of discipline.

After leaving Slavia he returned to Nigeria to play for Dolphins in 2012, although he has since moved to Scotland in 2013 and is currently playing for Edinburgh City whom he has recently gained promotion with into the Scottish League Two after spending three seasons with them, two of which were in the newly formed fifth tier of Scottish football.

Honours

With CD Suchitepéquez.
 Liga Nacional Runner-up: Clausura 2004–05

With Levski Sofia.
 Bulgarian Supercup: 2009

With FC Banants.
 Armenian Supercup Runner-up: 2010

With Edinburgh City
 Lowland Football League: 2014-15, 2015–16

References

External links

 Profile at LevskiSofia.info

1986 births
Living people
Nigerian footballers
First Professional Football League (Bulgaria) players
Association football forwards
PFC Slavia Sofia players
PFC Spartak Varna players
FC Urartu players
Chongqing Liangjiang Athletic F.C. players
Expatriate footballers in Bulgaria
Expatriate footballers in Armenia
Nigerian expatriates in Bulgaria
Sportspeople from Warri
Armenian Premier League players
Chinese Super League players
Expatriate footballers in China
F.C. Edinburgh players
Nigerian expatriates in Scotland
Expatriate footballers in Scotland
Lowland Football League players